Adam Sadler (born 9 January 1980) is an English football coach, who is currently a first team coach at Leicester City and the Northern Ireland national team.

Playing career
Sadler had stints in the youth academies at Newcastle United, Manchester United and Barnsley, before joining Scottish club Gretna. In August 2003, Blyth Spartans signed Sadler.

Coaching career
At the age of 21, Sadler entered coaching, joining Newcastle United in 2001. During his time at the club, Sadler was appointed reserve team manager, helping the side to win the Northumberland Senior Cup. A short spell at Norwich City under Glenn Roeder was followed by a return to North East England, where he was assistant manager at Blyth Spartans, Team Northumbria and Gateshead. Sadler later joined Plymouth Argyle, eventually becoming first team coach under manager Peter Reid. In August 2011, Sadler joined Manchester City as under-18 coach. Following two years at Manchester City, Sadler took up a coaching role at Ukrainian club Tavriya Simferopol.

In 2014, Sadler joined Leicester City as a tactical analyst under Nigel Pearson. In 2018, under the management of Claude Puel, Sadler was appointed as first-team coach. On 26 February 2019, following the sacking of Puel, Sadler and joint-caretaker manager Mike Stowell oversaw a 2–1 home win over Brighton & Hove Albion.

On 28 August 2021, Sadler joined the backroom staff of the Northern Ireland national team, in conjunction with his coaching role at Leicester City.

Managerial statistics

References

1980 births
Living people
Association football goalkeepers
English footballers
English football managers
Sportspeople from North Shields
Gretna F.C. players
Blyth Spartans A.F.C. players
Newcastle United F.C. non-playing staff
Norwich City F.C. non-playing staff
Plymouth Argyle F.C. non-playing staff
Manchester City F.C. non-playing staff
Leicester City F.C. non-playing staff
Leicester City F.C. managers
English expatriate sportspeople in Ukraine
Association football coaches